Europa , or Jupiter II, is the smallest of the four Galilean moons orbiting Jupiter, and the sixth-closest to the planet of all the 92 known moons of Jupiter. It is also the sixth-largest moon in the Solar System. Europa was discovered in 1610 by Galileo Galilei and was named after Europa, the Phoenician mother of King Minos of Crete and lover of Zeus (the Greek equivalent of the Roman god Jupiter).

Slightly smaller than Earth's Moon, Europa is primarily made of silicate rock and has a water-ice crust and probably an iron–nickel core. It has a very thin atmosphere, composed primarily of oxygen. Its white-beige surface is striated by light tan cracks and streaks, but craters are relatively few. In addition to Earth-bound telescope observations, Europa has been examined by a succession of space-probe flybys, the first occurring in the early 1970s. In September 2022, the Juno spacecraft flew within about 200 miles of Europa for a more recent close-up view.

Europa has the smoothest surface of any known solid object in the Solar System. The apparent youth and smoothness of the surface have led to the hypothesis that a water ocean exists beneath the surface, which could conceivably harbor extraterrestrial life. The predominant model suggests that heat from tidal flexing causes the ocean to remain liquid and drives ice movement similar to plate tectonics, absorbing chemicals from the surface into the ocean below. Sea salt from a subsurface ocean may be coating some geological features on Europa, suggesting that the ocean is interacting with the sea floor. This may be important in determining whether Europa could be habitable. In addition, the Hubble Space Telescope detected water vapor plumes similar to those observed on Saturn's moon Enceladus, which are thought to be caused by erupting cryogeysers. In May 2018, astronomers provided supporting evidence of water plume activity on Europa, based on an updated analysis of data obtained from the Galileo space probe, which orbited Jupiter from 1995 to 2003. Such plume activity could help researchers in a search for life from the subsurface Europan ocean without having to land on the moon.

The Galileo mission, launched in 1989, provides the bulk of current data on Europa. No spacecraft has yet landed on Europa, although there have been several proposed exploration missions. The European Space Agency's Jupiter Icy Moon Explorer (JUICE) is a mission to Ganymede that is due to launch in 2023 and will include two flybys of Europa. NASA's planned Europa Clipper should be launched in 2024, with a complementary lander possible based on its findings.

Discovery and naming
Europa, along with Jupiter's three other large moons, Io, Ganymede, and Callisto, was discovered by Galileo Galilei on 8 January 1610, and possibly independently by Simon Marius. The first reported observation of Io and Europa was made by Galileo on 7 January 1610 using a 20×-magnification refracting telescope at the University of Padua. However, in that observation, Galileo could not separate Io and Europa due to the low magnification of his telescope, so that the two were recorded as a single point of light. The following day, 8 January 1610 (used as the discovery date for Europa by the IAU), Io and Europa were seen for the first time as separate bodies during Galileo's observations of the Jupiter system.

Europa is the namesake of Europa, daughter of the king of Tyre, a Phoenician noblewoman in Greek mythology. Like all the Galilean satellites, Europa is named after a lover of Zeus, the Greek counterpart of Jupiter. Europa was courted by Zeus and became the queen of Crete. The naming scheme was suggested by Simon Marius, who attributed the proposal to Johannes Kepler:

The names fell out of favor for a considerable time and were not revived in general use until the mid-20th century. In 1892, the discovery of Amalthea, whose orbit lay closer to Jupiter than those of the Galilean moons, pushed Europa to the third position.
The adjectival form has stabilized as Europan.

Orbit and rotation 

Europa orbits Jupiter in just over three and a half days, with an orbital radius of about 670,900 km. With an orbital eccentricity of only 0.009, the orbit itself is nearly circular, and the orbital inclination relative to Jupiter's equatorial plane is small, at 0.470°. Like its fellow Galilean satellites, Europa is tidally locked to Jupiter, with one hemisphere of Europa constantly facing Jupiter. Because of this, there is a sub-Jovian point on Europa's surface, from which Jupiter would appear to hang directly overhead. Europa's prime meridian is a line passing through this point. Research suggests that the tidal locking may not be full, as a non-synchronous rotation has been proposed: Europa spins faster than it orbits, or at least did so in the past. This suggests an asymmetry in internal mass distribution and that a layer of subsurface liquid separates the icy crust from the rocky interior.

The slight eccentricity of Europa's orbit, maintained by the gravitational disturbances from the other Galileans, causes Europa's sub-Jovian point to oscillate around a mean position. As Europa comes slightly nearer to Jupiter, Jupiter's gravitational attraction increases, causing Europa to elongate towards and away from it. As Europa moves slightly away from Jupiter, Jupiter's gravitational force decreases, causing Europa to relax back into a more spherical shape, and creating tides in its ocean. The orbital eccentricity of Europa is continuously pumped by its mean-motion resonance with Io. Thus, the tidal flexing kneads Europa's interior and gives it a source of heat, possibly allowing its ocean to stay liquid while driving subsurface geological processes. The ultimate source of this energy is Jupiter's rotation, which is tapped by Io through the tides it raises on Jupiter and is transferred to Europa and Ganymede by the orbital resonance.

Analysis of the unique cracks lining Europa yielded evidence that it likely spun around a tilted axis at some point in time. If correct, this would explain many of Europa's features. Europa's immense network of crisscrossing cracks serves as a record of the stresses caused by massive tides in its global ocean. Europa's tilt could influence calculations of how much of its history is recorded in its frozen shell, how much heat is generated by tides in its ocean, and even how long the ocean has been liquid. Its ice layer must stretch to accommodate these changes. When there is too much stress, it cracks. A tilt in Europa's axis could suggest that its cracks may be much more recent than previously thought. The reason for this is that the direction of the spin pole may change by as much as a few degrees per day, completing one precession period over several months. A tilt could also affect the estimates of the age of Europa's ocean. Tidal forces are thought to generate the heat that keeps Europa's ocean liquid, and a tilt in the spin axis would cause more heat to be generated by tidal forces. Such additional heat would have allowed the ocean to remain liquid for a longer time. However, it has not yet been determined when this hypothesized shift in the spin axis might have occurred.

Physical characteristics

Europa is slightly smaller than the Moon. Though by a wide margin the least massive of the Galilean satellites, it is nonetheless more massive than all known moons in the Solar System smaller than itself combined. Its bulk density suggests that it is similar in composition to the terrestrial planets, being primarily composed of silicate rock.

Internal structure

Recent magnetic-field data from the Galileo orbiter showed that Europa has an induced magnetic field through interaction with Jupiter's, which suggests the presence of a subsurface conductive layer. This layer is likely to be a salty liquid-water ocean. Portions of the crust are estimated to have undergone a rotation of nearly 80°, nearly flipping over (see true polar wander), which would be unlikely if the ice were solidly attached to the mantle. Europa probably contains a metallic iron core.

Surface features
Europa is the smoothest known object in the Solar System, lacking large-scale features such as mountains and craters. However, according to one study, Europa's equator may be covered in icy spikes called penitentes, which may be up to 15 meters high, due to direct overhead sunlight on the equator, causing the ice to sublime, forming vertical cracks. Although the imaging available from the Galileo orbiter does not have the resolution for confirmation, radar and thermal data are consistent with this interpretation. The prominent markings crisscrossing Europa appear to be mainly albedo features that emphasize low topography. There are few craters on Europa, because its surface is tectonically too active and therefore young. Europa's icy crust has an albedo (light reflectivity) of 0.64, one of the highest of all moons. This indicates a young and active surface: based on estimates of the frequency of cometary bombardment that Europa experiences, the surface is about 20 to 180 million years old. There is currently no full scientific consensus among the sometimes contradictory explanations for the surface features of Europa.

The ionizing radiation level at the surface of Europa is equivalent to a dose of about 5.4 Sv (540 rem) per day, an amount that would cause severe illness or death in human beings exposed for a single Earth-day (24 hours). The duration of a Europan day is approximately 3.5 times that of a day on Earth.

Lineae 

Europa's most striking surface features are a series of dark streaks crisscrossing the entire globe, called lineae. Close examination shows that the edges of Europa's crust on either side of the cracks have moved relative to each other.

The most likely hypothesis is that the lineae on Europa were produced by a series of eruptions of warm ice as Europa's crust slowly spreads open to expose warmer layers beneath. The effect would have been similar to that seen in Earth's oceanic ridges. These various fractures are thought to have been caused in large part by the tidal flexing exerted by Jupiter. Because Europa is tidally locked to Jupiter, and therefore always maintains approximately the same orientation towards Jupiter, the stress patterns should form a distinctive and predictable pattern. However, only the youngest of Europa's fractures conform to the predicted pattern; other fractures appear to occur at increasingly different orientations the older they are. This could be explained if Europa's surface rotates slightly faster than its interior, an effect that is possible due to the subsurface ocean mechanically decoupling Europa's surface from its rocky mantle and the effects of Jupiter's gravity tugging on Europa's outer ice crust. Comparisons of Voyager and Galileo spacecraft photos serve to put an upper limit on this hypothetical slippage. A full revolution of the outer rigid shell relative to the interior of Europa takes at least 12,000 years. Studies of Voyager and Galileo images have revealed evidence of subduction on Europa's surface, suggesting that, just as the cracks are analogous to ocean ridges, so plates of icy crust analogous to tectonic plates on Earth are recycled into the molten interior. This evidence of both crustal spreading at bands and convergence at other sites suggests that Europa may have active plate tectonics, similar to Earth. However, the physics driving these plate tectonics are not likely to resemble those driving terrestrial plate tectonics, as the forces resisting potential Earth-like plate motions in Europa's crust are significantly stronger than the forces that could drive them.

Chaos and lenticulae 
 

Other features present on Europa are circular and elliptical lenticulae (Latin for "freckles"). Many are domes, some are pits and some are smooth, dark spots. Others have a jumbled or rough texture. The dome tops look like pieces of the older plains around them, suggesting that the domes formed when the plains were pushed up from below.

One hypothesis states that these lenticulae were formed by diapirs of warm ice rising up through the colder ice of the outer crust, much like magma chambers in Earth's crust. The smooth, dark spots could be formed by meltwater released when the warm ice breaks through the surface. The rough, jumbled lenticulae (called regions of "chaos"; for example, Conamara Chaos) would then be formed from many small fragments of crust, embedded in hummocky, dark material, appearing like icebergs in a frozen sea.

An alternative hypothesis suggests that lenticulae are actually small areas of chaos and that the claimed pits, spots and domes are artefacts resulting from over-interpretation of early, low-resolution Galileo images. The implication is that the ice is too thin to support the convective diapir model of feature formation.

In November 2011, a team of researchers from the University of Texas at Austin and elsewhere presented evidence in the journal Nature suggesting that many "chaos terrain" features on Europa sit atop vast lakes of liquid water. These lakes would be entirely encased in Europa's icy outer shell and distinct from a liquid ocean thought to exist farther down beneath the ice shell. Full confirmation of the lakes' existence will require a space mission designed to probe the ice shell either physically or indirectly, for example, using radar.

Work published by researchers from Williams College suggests that chaos terrain may represent sites where impacting comets penetrated through the ice crust and into an underlying ocean.

Subsurface ocean 

Scientists' consensus is that a layer of liquid water exists beneath Europa's surface, and that heat from tidal flexing allows the subsurface ocean to remain liquid. The first hints of a subsurface ocean came from theoretical considerations of tidal heating (a consequence of Europa's slightly eccentric orbit and orbital resonance with the other Galilean moons). Galileo imaging team members argue for the existence of a subsurface ocean from analysis of Voyager and Galileo images. The most dramatic example is "chaos terrain", a common feature on Europa's surface that some interpret as a region where the subsurface ocean has melted through the icy crust. This interpretation is controversial. Most geologists who have studied Europa favor what is commonly called the "thick ice" model, in which the ocean has rarely, if ever, directly interacted with the present surface. The best evidence for the thick-ice model is a study of Europa's large craters. This leads to a volume of Europa's oceans of 3 × 1018 m3, between two or three times the volume of Earth's oceans.

The thin-ice model suggests that Europa's ice shell may be only a few kilometers thick. However, most planetary scientists conclude that this model considers only those topmost layers of Europa's crust that behave elastically when affected by Jupiter's tides. One example is flexure analysis, in which Europa's crust is modeled as a plane or sphere weighted and flexed by a heavy load. If the ice shell of Europa is really only a few kilometers thick, this "thin ice" model would mean that regular contact of the liquid interior with the surface could occur through open ridges, causing the formation of areas of chaotic terrain. Large impacts going fully through the ice crust would also be a way that the subsurface ocean could be exposed.

Composition

The Galileo orbiter found that Europa has a weak magnetic moment, which is induced by the varying part of the Jovian magnetic field. The field strength at the magnetic equator (about 120 nT) created by this magnetic moment is about one-sixth the strength of Ganymede's field and six times the value of Callisto's. The existence of the induced moment requires a layer of a highly electrically conductive material in Europa's interior. The most plausible candidate for this role is a large subsurface ocean of liquid saltwater.

Since the Voyager spacecraft flew past Europa in 1979, scientists have worked to understand the composition of the reddish-brown material that coats fractures and other geologically youthful features on Europa's surface. Spectrographic evidence suggests that the darker, reddish streaks and features on Europa's surface may be rich in salts such as magnesium sulfate, deposited by evaporating water that emerged from within. Sulfuric acid hydrate is another possible explanation for the contaminant observed spectroscopically. In either case, because these materials are colorless or white when pure, some other material must also be present to account for the reddish color, and sulfur compounds are suspected.

Another hypothesis for the colored regions is that they are composed of abiotic organic compounds collectively called tholins. The morphology of Europa's impact craters and ridges is suggestive of fluidized material welling up from the fractures where pyrolysis and radiolysis take place. In order to generate colored tholins on Europa there must be a source of materials (carbon, nitrogen, and water) and a source of energy to make the reactions occur. Impurities in the water ice crust of Europa are presumed both to emerge from the interior as cryovolcanic events that resurface the body, and to accumulate from space as interplanetary dust. Tholins bring important astrobiological implications, as they may play a role in prebiotic chemistry and abiogenesis.

The presence of sodium chloride in the internal ocean has been suggested by a 450 nm absorption feature, characteristic of irradiated NaCl crystals, that has been spotted in HST observations of the chaos regions, presumed to be areas of recent subsurface upwelling.

Sources of heat

Europa receives from tidal heating, which occurs through the tidal friction and tidal flexing processes caused by tidal acceleration: orbital and rotational energy are dissipated as heat in the core of the moon, the internal ocean, and the ice crust.

Tidal friction
Ocean tides are converted to heat by frictional losses in the oceans and their interaction with the solid bottom and with the top ice crust. In late 2008, it was suggested Jupiter may keep Europa's oceans warm by generating large planetary tidal waves on Europa because of its small but non-zero obliquity. This generates so-called Rossby waves that travel quite slowly, at just a few kilometers per day, but can generate significant kinetic energy. For the current axial tilt estimate of 0.1 degree, the resonance from Rossby waves would contain 7.3 J of kinetic energy, which is two thousand times larger than that of the flow excited by the dominant tidal forces. Dissipation of this energy could be the principal heat source of Europa's ocean.

Tidal flexing
Tidal flexing kneads Europa's interior and ice shell, which becomes a source of heat. Depending on the amount of tilt, the heat generated by the ocean flow could be 100 to thousands of times greater than the heat generated by the flexing of Europa's rocky core in response to the gravitational pull from Jupiter and the other moons circling that planet. Europa's seafloor could be heated by the moon's constant flexing, driving hydrothermal activity similar to undersea volcanoes in Earth's oceans.

Experiments and ice modeling published in 2016, indicate that tidal flexing dissipation can generate one order of magnitude more heat in Europa's ice than scientists had previously assumed. Their results indicate that most of the heat generated by the ice actually comes from the ice's crystalline structure (lattice) as a result of deformation, and not friction between the ice grains. The greater the deformation of the ice sheet, the more heat is generated.

Radioactive decay
In addition to tidal heating, the interior of Europa could also be heated by the decay of radioactive material (radiogenic heating) within the rocky mantle. But the models and values observed are one hundred times higher than those that could be produced by radiogenic heating alone, thus implying that tidal heating has a leading role in Europa.

Plumes 

The Hubble Space Telescope acquired an image of Europa in 2012 that was interpreted to be a plume of water vapour erupting from near its south pole. It has been suggested that if plumes exist, they are episodic and likely to appear when Europa is at its farthest point from Jupiter, in agreement with tidal force modeling predictions. Additional imaging evidence from the Hubble Space Telescope was presented in September 2016.

In May 2018, astronomers provided supporting evidence of water plume activity on Europa, based on an updated critical analysis of data obtained from the Galileo space probe, which orbited Jupiter between 1995 and 2003. Galileo flew by Europa in 1997 within  of the moon's surface and the researchers suggest it may have flown through a water plume. Such plume activity could help researchers in a search for life from the subsurface Europan ocean without having to land on the moon.

The tidal forces are about 1,000 times stronger than the Moon's effect on Earth. The only other moon in the Solar System exhibiting water vapor plumes is Enceladus. The estimated eruption rate at Europa is about 7000 kg/s compared to about 200 kg/s for the plumes of Enceladus. If confirmed, it would open the possibility of a flyby through the plume and obtain a sample to analyze in situ without having to use a lander and drill through kilometres of ice.

In November 2020, a study was published in the peer-reviewed scientific journal Geophysical Research Letters suggesting that the plumes may originate from water within the crust of Europa as opposed to its subsurface ocean. The study's model, using images from the Galileo space probe, proposed that a combination of freezing and pressurization may result in at least some of the cryovolcanic activity. The pressure generated by migrating briny water pockets would thus, eventually, burst through the crust thereby creating these plumes. The theory that cryovolcanism on Europa could be triggered by freezing and pressurization of liquid pockets in the icy crust was first proposed by researchers at the University of Hawai'i at Mānoa in 2003, who were the first to model this process. A press release from NASA's Jet Propulsion Laboratory referencing the November 2020 study suggested that plumes sourced from migrating liquid pockets could potentially be less hospitable to life. This is due to a lack of substantial energy for organisms to thrive off of, unlike proposed hydrothermal vents on the subsurface ocean floor.

Atmosphere 

The atmosphere of Europa can be categorized as thin and tenuous (often called an exosphere), primarily composed of oxygen and trace amounts of water vapor. However, this quantity of oxygen is produced in a non-biological manner. Given that Europa’s surface is icy, and subsequently very cold; as solar ultraviolet radiation and charged particles (ions and electrons) from the Jovian magnetospheric environment collide with Europa's surface, water vapor is created and instantaneously separated into oxygen and hydrogen constituents. As it continues to move, the hydrogen is light enough to pass through the surface gravity of the atmosphere leaving behind only oxygen. The surface-bounded atmosphere forms through radiolysis, the dissociation of molecules through radiation. This accumulated oxygen atmosphere can get to a height of 190 km above the surface of Europa. Molecular oxygen is the densest component of the atmosphere because it has a long lifetime; after returning to the surface, it does not stick (freeze) like a water or hydrogen peroxide molecule but rather desorbs from the surface and starts another ballistic arc. Molecular hydrogen never reaches the surface, as it is light enough to escape Europa's surface gravity. Europa is one of the few moons in our solar system with a quantifiable atmosphere, along wih Titan, Io, Triton, Ganymede and Callisto. Europa is also one of the three formations, among planets and moons, to contain oxygen within its atmosphere. Europa is also one of several moons in our solar system with very large quantities of ice (volatiles), otherwise known as "icy moons."Europa is also considered to be geologically active due to the constant release of hydrogen-oxygen mixture into space. As a result of the moon’s particle venting, the atmosphere requires continuous replenishment. Europa also contains a small magnetosphere (approximately 25% of Ganymede’s). However, this magnetosphere varies in size as Europa orbits through Jupiter's magnetic field. This confirms that a conductive element, such as a large ocean, likely lies below its icy surface. As multiple studies have been conducted over Europa’s atmosphere, several findings conclude that not all oxygen molecules are released into the atmosphere. This unknown percentage of oxygen may be absorbed into the surface and sink into the subsurface. Because the surface may interact with the subsurface ocean (considering the geological discussion above), this molecular oxygen may make its way to the ocean, where it could aid in biological processes. One estimate suggests that, given the turnover rate inferred from the apparent ~0.5 Gyr maximum age of Europa's surface ice, subduction of radiolytically generated oxidizing species might well lead to oceanic free oxygen concentrations that are comparable to those in terrestrial deep oceans.

Through the slow release of oxygen and hydrogen, a neutral torus around Europa’s orbital plane is formed. This "neutral cloud" has been detected by both the Cassini and Galileo spacecraft, and has a greater content (number of atoms and molecules) than the neutral cloud surrounding Jupiter's inner moon Io. This torus was officially confirmed using Energetic Neutral Atom (ENA) imaging. Europa’s torus ionizes through the process of neutral particles exchanging electrons with its charged particles. Since Europa’s magnetic field rotates faster than its orbit velocity, these ions are left in the path of its magnetic field trajectory, forming a plasma. It has been theorized that these ions are responsible for the plasma within Jupiter's magnetosphere.

Discovery of atmosphere 
The atmosphere of Europa was first discovered in 1995 by Hall Al. and the Goddard High Resolution Spectrograph of the Hubble telescope. This observation was then confirmed in 1997 by the Galileo probe, built by Hughes Aircraft Company and operated by NASA. The Galileo probe flew only three miles above the estimated maximum atmospheric line (190 km from Europa's surface). Still, it then changed course to collide with Jupiter's atmosphere to prevent unwanted impact on Europa's surface. It has been speculated that there will be several more future missions to Europa in hopes of further studying the atmosphere, chemical composition, and possibility of extraterrestrial life below the icy surface.

Climate and weather 
Despite the presence of a gas torus, Europa has no weather producing clouds. As a whole, Europa has no wind, precipitation, or presence of sky color as its gravity is too low to hold an atmosphere substantial enough for these phenomena. Europa's gravity is approximately 13% of Earth's. The temperature on Europa varies from −160 °C at the equatorial line, to −220 °C at either of its poles. Europa's subsurface ocean is thought to be subsequently warm however. It is theorized that because of radioactive and tidal heating (as mentioned in the sections above), there are points in the depths of Europa's ocean that may only be slightly cooler than that of Earth's oceans. Studies have also concluded that Europa's ocean would have been rather acidic at first, with large concentrations of sulfate, calcium, and carbon dioxide. But over the course of 4.5 billion years, it became full of chloride, thus resembling our 1.94% chloride oceans on Earth.

Exploration 

Exploration of Europa began with the Jupiter flybys of Pioneer 10 and 11 in 1973 and 1974 respectively. The first closeup photos were of low resolution compared to later missions. The two Voyager probes traveled through the Jovian system in 1979, providing more-detailed images of Europa's icy surface. The images caused many scientists to speculate about the possibility of a liquid ocean underneath. 
Starting in 1995, the Galileo space probe orbited Jupiter for eight years, until 2003, and provided the most detailed examination of the Galilean moons to date. It included the "Galileo Europa Mission" and "Galileo Millennium Mission", with numerous close flybys of Europa. In 2007, New Horizons imaged Europa, as it flew by the Jovian system while on its way to Pluto. In 2022, the Juno orbiter flew by Europa at a distance of 352 km (219 mi).

Future missions 

Conjectures regarding extraterrestrial life have ensured a high profile for Europa and have led to steady lobbying for future missions. The aims of these missions have ranged from examining Europa's chemical composition to searching for extraterrestrial life in its hypothesized subsurface oceans. Robotic missions to Europa need to endure the high-radiation environment around Jupiter. Because it is deeply embedded within Jupiter's magnetosphere, Europa receives about 5.40 Sv of radiation per day.

In 2011, a Europa mission was recommended by the U.S. Planetary Science Decadal Survey. In response, NASA commissioned Europa lander concept studies in 2011, along with concepts for a Europa flyby (Europa Clipper), and a Europa orbiter. The orbiter element option concentrates on the "ocean" science, while the multiple-flyby element (Clipper) concentrates on the chemistry and energy science. On 13 January 2014, the House Appropriations Committee announced a new bipartisan bill that includes $80 million funding to continue the Europa mission concept studies.
 In 2012, Jupiter Icy Moon Explorer (JUICE) was selected by the European Space Agency (ESA) as a planned mission. That mission includes 2 flybys of Europa, but is more focused on Ganymede.
 Europa Clipper – In July 2013 an updated concept for a flyby Europa mission called Europa Clipper was presented by the Jet Propulsion Laboratory (JPL) and the Applied Physics Laboratory (APL). In May 2015, NASA announced that it had accepted development of the Europa Clipper mission, and revealed the instruments it will use. The aim of Europa Clipper is to explore Europa in order to investigate its habitability, and to aid selecting sites for a future lander. The Europa Clipper would not orbit Europa, but instead orbit Jupiter and conduct 45 low-altitude flybys of Europa during its envisioned mission. The probe would carry an ice-penetrating radar, short-wave infrared spectrometer, topographical imager, and an ion- and neutral-mass spectrometer.
Europa Lander (NASA) is a recent concept mission under study. 2018 research suggests Europa may be covered in tall, jagged ice spikes, presenting a problem for any potential landing on its surface.

Old proposals 

In the early 2000s, Jupiter Europa Orbiter led by NASA and the Jupiter Ganymede Orbiter led by the ESA were proposed together as an Outer Planet Flagship Mission to Jupiter's icy moons called Europa Jupiter System Mission, with a planned launch in 2020. In 2009 it was given priority over Titan Saturn System Mission. At that time, there was competition from other proposals. Japan proposed Jupiter Magnetospheric Orbiter.

Jovian Europa Orbiter was an ESA Cosmic Vision concept study from 2007. Another concept was Ice Clipper, which would have used an impactor similar to the Deep Impact mission—it would make a controlled crash into the surface of Europa, generating a plume of debris that would then be collected by a small spacecraft flying through the plume.

Jupiter Icy Moons Orbiter (JIMO) was a partially developed fission-powered spacecraft with ion thrusters that was cancelled in 2006. It was part of Project Prometheus. The Europa Lander Mission proposed a small nuclear-powered Europa lander for JIMO. It would travel with the orbiter, which would also function as a communication relay to Earth.

Europa Orbiter – Its objective would be to characterize the extent of the ocean and its relation to the deeper interior. Instrument payload could include a radio subsystem, laser altimeter, magnetometer, Langmuir probe, and a mapping camera. The Europa Orbiter received a go-ahead in 1999 but was canceled in 2002. This orbiter featured a special ice-penetrating radar that would allow it to scan below the surface.

More ambitious ideas have been put forward including an impactor in combination with a thermal drill to search for biosignatures that might be frozen in the shallow subsurface.

Another proposal put forward in 2001 calls for a large nuclear-powered "melt probe" (cryobot) that would melt through the ice until it reached an ocean below. Once it reached the water, it would deploy an autonomous underwater vehicle (hydrobot) that would gather information and send it back to Earth. Both the cryobot and the hydrobot would have to undergo some form of extreme sterilization to prevent detection of Earth organisms instead of native life and to prevent contamination of the subsurface ocean. This suggested approach has not yet reached a formal conceptual planning stage.

Habitability
So far, there is no evidence that life exists on Europa, but Europa has emerged as one of the most likely locations in the Solar System for potential habitability. Life could exist in its under-ice ocean, perhaps in an environment similar to Earth's deep-ocean hydrothermal vents. Even if Europa lacks volcanic hydrothermal activity, a 2016 NASA study found that Earth-like levels of hydrogen and oxygen could be produced through processes related to serpentinization and ice-derived oxidants, which do not directly involve volcanism. In 2015, scientists announced that salt from a subsurface ocean may likely be coating some geological features on Europa, suggesting that the ocean is interacting with the seafloor. This may be important in determining if Europa could be habitable. The likely presence of liquid water in contact with Europa's rocky mantle has spurred calls to send a probe there.

The energy provided by tidal forces drives active geological processes within Europa's interior, just as they do to a far more obvious degree on its sister moon Io. Although Europa, like the Earth, may possess an internal energy source from radioactive decay, the energy generated by tidal flexing would be several orders of magnitude greater than any radiological source. Life on Europa could exist clustered around hydrothermal vents on the ocean floor, or below the ocean floor, where endoliths are known to inhabit on Earth. Alternatively, it could exist clinging to the lower surface of Europa's ice layer, much like algae and bacteria in Earth's polar regions, or float freely in Europa's ocean. If Europa's ocean is too cold, biological processes similar to those known on Earth could not take place. If it is too salty, only extreme halophiles could survive in that environment. In 2010, a model proposed by Richard Greenberg of the University of Arizona proposed that irradiation of ice on Europa's surface could saturate its crust with oxygen and peroxide, which could then be transported by tectonic processes into the interior ocean. Such a process could render Europa's ocean as oxygenated as our own within just 12 million years, allowing the existence of complex, multicellular lifeforms.

Evidence suggests the existence of lakes of liquid water entirely encased in Europa's icy outer shell and distinct from a liquid ocean thought to exist farther down beneath the ice shell, as well as pockets of water that form M shaped ice ridges when the water freezes on the surface - like in Greenland. If confirmed, the lakes and pockets of water could be yet another potential habitat for life. Evidence suggests that hydrogen peroxide is abundant across much of the surface of Europa. Because hydrogen peroxide decays into oxygen and water when combined with liquid water, the authors argue that it could be an important energy supply for simple life forms.

Clay-like minerals (specifically, phyllosilicates), often associated with organic matter on Earth, have been detected on the icy crust of Europa. The presence of the minerals may have been the result of a collision with an asteroid or comet. Some scientists have speculated that life on Earth could have been blasted into space by asteroid collisions and arrived on the moons of Jupiter in a process called lithopanspermia.

See also

 Colonization of Europa
 Jupiter's moons in fiction
 List of craters on Europa
 List of geological features on Europa
 List of lineae on Europa
 Snowball Earth hypothesis

Notes

References

Further reading

External links

 Europa Profile at NASA
 Europa Facts at The Nine Planets
 Europa Facts at Views of the Solar System
 Preventing Forward Contamination of Europa – USA Space Studies Board (2000)
 Images of Europa at JPL's Planetary Photojournal
 Movie of Europa's rotation from the National Oceanic and Atmospheric Administration
 Europa map with feature names from Planetary Photojournal
 Europa nomenclature and Europa map with feature names from the USGS planetary nomenclature page
 Paul Schenk's 3D images and flyover videos of Europa and other outer Solar System satellites; see also
 Large, high-resolution Galileo image mosaics of Europan terrain from Jason Perry at JPL: 1, 2, 3, 4, 5, 6, 7
 Europa image montage from Galileo spacecraft NASA
 View of Europa from Galileo flybys
 Google Europa 3D, interactive map of the moon
 High-resolution animation by Kevin M. Gill of a flyover of Europa; see album for more

16100108
 
Discoveries by Galileo Galilei
Discoveries by Simon Marius
Moons of Jupiter
Moons with a prograde orbit